Defend International (commonly known as DI) is a non-governmental organization with a self-stated focus on promoting and protecting human rights in the Middle East and North Africa region. Defend International was founded in 2007.

The co-founder of the organisation, Dr. Widad Akreyi, was awarded the International Pfeffer Peace Award and the 2017 Pacem in Terris Award for her "commitment to human rights for all."

Structure
Defend International is made up of voluntary members and representatives. The organisation states that since its establishment, it has collaborated with many civic and humanitarian organisations as well as agencies of various nations.

The structure is based on national, sub-regional and regional networks of individuals and civil society organisations.

Partnership
Defend International is a partner of the Global Alliance for Clean Cookstoves, an initiative led by the United Nations Foundation and a member of the Peace One Day NGO Coalition and Peace Now.

Work
Defend International states that it was formed to target governments, parliaments, international institutions and non-governmental groups or organizations.

DI reports that it has been active in: 
 Defending the rights of minorities (e.g., Christians outside of western countries and Yazidis) and ending modern-day slavery
 Ending capital punishment
 Stopping Torture
 Protecting the rights of Prisoners of Conscience and Civil Society Activists
 Defending Children's Rights 
 Defending Women's Rights 
 Defending the rights of human rights defenders 
 Defending the rights of Refugees 
 Reviewing healthcare policies and human rights legislation
 Safeguarding the Environment
Promoting Disarmament and International Security

Humanitarian Campaigns and Charitable Activities

Defending Women and Girls
The organisation expresses that it has identified strategies to address violence against women and child marriages

It has called for an end to female genital mutilation, the elimination of all forms of violence and discrimination against women and girls, and called on UN negotiators of the Arms Trade Treaty to include a legally-binding provision to prevent armed gender-based violence.

According to Everywoman Everywhere Coalition, Defend International has endorsed an international treaty on violence against women and girls worldwide and is a member of Everywoman Everywhere Coalition.

Defending Yazidis, Christians and Kobanî
Through partnerships with artists like Edison band, Claude Arfaras, Jane Adams and Daniel Dalopo, Defend International launched a worldwide campaign in September 2014 to raise awareness about the Yazidis, Kobanî and the Christians.

Co-founder of Defend International stated that ISIL uses slavery and rape as weapons of war against Yazidis and Christians. She asked the international community to intensify the efforts aimed at rescuing women and girls enslaved by ISIL.

Charity
In October 2014, co-founder of Defend International was awarded the International Pfeffer Peace Award, which she dedicated to all victims of persecution, particularly the Yazidis, Christians and all residents of Kobane.

External links

Defend International official site

References

International human rights organizations
Imprisonment and detention
Prison-related organizations
2007 establishments in Norway